Na veka is Russian pop rock band Korni's debut album, released in May 2003 by Mainstream Production.

Track listing 
 Standard Edition
 «Ты узнаешь её»
 «Это ты объявила войну»
 «5000 тонн света»
 «Плакала берёза»
 «Только я и ты»
 «Догоняй»
 «А мне бы голубем»
 «Изо льда»
 «We Will Rock You»
 «Позови меня»
 «Девчонки, рокеры и один DJ»
 «Я теряю корни»
 «Куда глаза глядят»
 «На века»
 Reissue
 «С днём рождения, Вика!»
 «Плакала берёза» (Remix)
 «С днём рождения, Вика!» (Remix)

Musical style 

The album was recorded in the genre Europop to the influence of synthpop and pop rock.
 Composition "Ty uznaesh ee" is a fusion of pop rap, blues and Europop with a loud refrain, which adds to the song elements  alternative – pop rock.
 "Plakala bereza" - also applies to easy  alternative (Britpop), which was later also pronounced in the song "Naperegonki s vetrom".
 "Devochki, rokery i odin DJ" - this glam rock composition with strong influence of ethnic, dance-pop and electropop.
 "S dnem rozhdeniya Vika" - power ballad, written by guitarist Alexandr Astashenok.
 The album also includes a cover of traditional pop / jazz hit "Kuda glaza glyadyat".

References

External links
 Официальный сайт «Фабрики Звёзд-1»

2003 debut albums